Speedway is a town in Wayne Township, Marion County, Indiana, United States. The population was 11,812 at the 2010 U.S. Census. Speedway, which is an enclave of Indianapolis, is the home of the Indianapolis Motor Speedway.

History
Speedway was laid out in 1912 as a residential suburb. It took its name from the Indianapolis Motor Speedway. It is an early example of a residential community planned for the industrial plants located nearby. Carl G. Fisher, James A. Allison, Frank Wheeler, and Arthur Newby, founders of the Indianapolis Motor Speedway, planned the suburb of Speedway west of the track. Fisher and Allison owned plants that needed workers, the Prest-O-Lite factory and Allison Engine Company. The investors' goal was to create a city without horses, where residents would drive automobiles, as well as participate in creating mechanical parts for new modes of transportation.

The Speedway Historic District was listed on the National Register of Historic Places in 2005.

Geography
Speedway is located at  (39.791943, −86.249988).

Climate
The climate in this area is characterized by hot, humid summers and generally mild to cool winters.  According to the Köppen Climate Classification system, Speedway has a humid subtropical climate, Cfa on climate maps. With a January daily mean of  however, Speedway is very close to the humid continental type.

Demographics

2010 census
As of the census of 2010, 11,812 people, 5,550 households, and 2,931 families resided in the town. The 6,709 housing units averaged . The racial makeup of the town was 74.2% White, 16.7% African American, 0.3% Native American, 2.0% Asian, 4.4% from other races, and 2.3% from two or more races. Hispanics or Latinos of any race were 7.6% of the population.

Of the 5,550 households, 26.9% had children under the age of 18 living with them, 32.4% were married couples living together, 15.3% had a female householder with no husband present, 5.2% had a male householder with no wife present, and 47.2% were not families. About 39.9% of all households were made up of individuals, and 12.9% had someone living alone who was 65 years of age or older. The average household size was 2.13 and the average family size was 2.84.

The median age in the town was 37.8 years. About 21.7% of residents were under the age of 18; 10.8% were between the ages of 18 and 24; 26.7% were from 25 to 44; 25.8% were from 45 to 64; and 14.8% were 65 years of age or older. The gender makeup of the town was 48.3% male and 51.7% female.

2000 census
As of the census of 2000, 12,882 people, 6,151 households, and 3,278 families resided in the town. 
The 6,151 households had 24.5% with children under the age of 18 living with them, 36.6%  married couples living together, 12.5% female householders with no husband present, and 46.7% not families. 
In the town, the population was spread out, with 20.9% under the age of 18, 10.1% from 18 to 24, 31.5% from 25 to 44, 20.2% from 45 to 64, and 17.2% who were 65 years of age or older. The median age was 37 years. For every 100 females, there were 89.2 males. For every 100 females age 18 and over, there were 84.9 males.

The median income for a household in the town was $37,713, and for a family was $49,005. Males had a median income of $36,756 versus $26,954 for females. The per capita income for the town was $21,468. About 5.6% of families and 8.8% of the population were below the poverty line, including 7.7% of those under age 18 and 9.5% of those age 65 or over.

Education
 The School Town of Speedway has six campuses, including the Speedway Senior High School, and an enrollment of approximately 1,650 students.
 St Christopher School

The town has a lending library, the Speedway Public Library.

Economy

In addition to the Indianapolis Motor Speedway itself, several related companies are located south of the racetrack, including the United States Auto Club headquarters, the Dallara racecar factory, racing teams A. J. Foyt Racing, and Harding Racing, and the Speedway Indoor karting racetrack. Also, Allison Transmission has a factory nearby.

Notable people
Donald Davidson, historian
Joyce DeWitt, actress
Barbara Higbie, jazz musician and composer
Mason Jobst, ice hockey player
J. Emmett McManamon, 33rd Indiana Attorney General

Sister cities
 Motegi, Tochigi, Japan
 Varano de' Melegari, Italy

See also
Burger Chef murders
Speedway bombings

References

External links

Towns in Indiana
Towns in Marion County, Indiana
Indianapolis metropolitan area
Populated places established in 1926
1926 establishments in Indiana
Enclaves in the United States